Dinocephalosauridae is an extinct clade of marine and terrestrial archosauromorph reptiles that lived throughout the Triassic period. Like tanystropheids, they are characterized by their long necks, lengthened by either addition of cervical vertebrae or elongation  of the individual bones.

Dinocephalosaurids are known from Europe (Poland, Germany, Austria, Netherlands) and China.
 Some members (i.e. Dinocephalosaurus) are solely marine animals, most likely living near the coastlines of the Tethys Ocean, while other members (i.e. Pectodens were purely terrestrial, suggesting wide ecological diversity in just the few known species in this family.

Classification

In 2021, a phylogenetic study was conducted by S. Spiekman, N. Fraser, and T. Schayer in an attempt to clarify the systematics of "protorosaur" groups. A total of 16 individual trees were found using different character scoring methods and unstable OTU exclusions. The results of analysis 3A, with ratio and ordered characters treated as such and pruning 5 out of 40 OTUs a posteriori to offer maximum resolution/minimum polytomies, are shown:

The clade Dinocephalosauridae is defined node-basedly as "Dinocephalosaurus orientalis, Pectodens zhenyuensis, their most recent common ancestor, and all its descendants."

References

Prehistoric archosauromorphs
Middle Triassic reptiles
Triassic first appearances
Triassic extinctions